Kinlochbervie is a scattered harbour village in the north west of Sutherland, in the Highland region of Scotland. It is the most northerly port on the west coast of Scotland.

Geography
Sandwood Bay, a scenic beach, is about a  drive or a  walk north of Kinlochbervie. Other scenic areas close to the village include Oldshoremore Beach and Rhiconich.

Fishing
The majority of local industry is based upon fishing. Although the fleet of ships actually based in Kinlochbervie is rather small, many ships from the east coast of Scotland land their catches in Kinlochbervie. The dominant feature of the town is the large fish handling depot. From here catches are loaded onto large refrigerated lorries for transport by road throughout Europe. The importance of this link to the outside world to the local economy means that Kinlochbervie has surprisingly good road links, given its remote location and rugged local geography.

Tourism
The local scenery is a tourist attraction and is also an important part of the local economy. There are many holiday homes and small bed and breakfast businesses in the area. The largest in the village is Kinlochbervie Hotel.

Time Team excavation
On Sunday 20 January 2002 the first airing of Time Teams excavation of the area began. The artefacts found included two anchors, five iron cannons and Spanish pottery from the 16th century. The site was designated as a Historic Maritime Protected Area in 2013.

Sporting achievements
The village also has a rather successful amateur football team, which competes in the local amateur league along with Durness, Tongue, Bettyhill, Lochinver and Melvich. In 2005 they won the league trophy, the prestigious Stafford Cup, for the first time in many years. The team also won The Guy Cup in the same year by winning a tournament of local teams. This was the first time a team west of the Kyle of Tongue had won it.

The sport of shinty has recently been resurrected in Kinlochbervie by the local school, shinty was once played across North Sutherland until the 20th century but never competitively. Kinlochbervie Camanachd Club now compete at junior level against teams from across the Highlands.

Cultural references
The village features prominently in Irish writer Brian Friel's play Faith Healer. Sailor Frank Dye started his  journey to Iceland in a small Wayfarer dinghy from the village in 1963.

Inhabitants of Kinlochbervie are sometimes collectively referred to as "Greeks" by the residents of surrounding villages, for reasons now largely unknown. The village itself is sometimes referred to as "KLB". The most common surname in the area is "Morrison".

Gallery

References

External links
Kinlochbervie Website
John Muir Trust Sandwood Bay
Sandwood Bay by John Muir Trust
Channel 4 replay

Populated places in Sutherland
Ports and harbours of Scotland
Fishing communities in Scotland
Historic Marine Protected Areas of Scotland